Perrot may refer to:

 People
 Claude-Hélène Perrot (1928-2019), French historian and Africanist 
 François-Marie Perrot (1644–1691), governor of Montreal
 Georges Perrot (1832–1914), French archaeologist
 Henri Perrot (1883-1961), a French engineer.
 James Perrot (1571–1636), Welsh writer and Member of Parliament
 Jean Perrot (1920–2012), French archaeologist
 Jean-Marie Perrot (1877–1943), Breton independentist
 John Perrot (1528–1592), Lord Deputy of Ireland
 Jules Perrot (1810–1892), French dancer and choreographer
 Kim Perrot (1967–1999), American basketball player
 Marcel Perrot, French fencer
 Nicolas Perrot (1644–1717), French explorer and diplomat
 Nicole Perrot (born 1983), Chilean golfer
 Xavier Perrot (1932–2008), Swiss racing driver

 Places
 Île Perrot, an island in southwestern Quebec, Canada
 L'Île-Perrot, Quebec, Canada

 Other
 Bezen Perrot, Breton collaborationist unit that fought for Germany in WWII

See also 
 Perot (disambiguation)